Cedrick Ward Hardman (October 4, 1948 – March 8, 2019) was an American Football defensive end who played for the National Football League (NFL)'s San Francisco 49ers and Oakland Raiders and the United States Football League (USFL)'s Oakland Invaders.  Hardman's thirteen-year professional football career lasted from 1970 to 1981 in the NFL and ended as a player/coach in 1983 with the USFL's Oakland Invaders. Hardman held the record for most sacks in a season for the 49ers recording 18 sacks in only 14 games during his 1971 Pro Bowl season with the 49ers until 2012, when it was broken by Aldon Smith with 19.5.

College
Hardman played college football at North Texas State University, (renamed the University of North Texas in 1988).  Hardman was an All-Missouri Valley Conference football defensive lineman. In a historic manner, Hardman recorded 30 sacks in his senior season at North Texas State including an 11-sack performance in North Texas' 1969 Homecoming game against Tulsa. Hardman represented North Texas State in the Blue-Gray and Senior Bowl all-star games in 1970 earning defensive most valuable player honors after recording 4 sacks in each game.  Including the all-star games, Hardman accounted for 38 sacks during his final year at North Texas.

During his first two seasons in Denton, Hardman lined up on the same defense as future Pro Football Hall of Fame enshrinee "Mean" Joe Greene.

Cedrick started playing college football as a defensive back, then moved to linebacker in his sophomore season. His final two college years were spent playing defensive end. Hardman was drafted with the ninth overall selection in the first round of the 1970 NFL Draft by the San Francisco 49ers.

Professional career

NFL career
Hardman is the current all-time sack leader for the San Francisco 49ers franchise, recording 107 sacks between 1970 and 1979 and he had  with the Raiders in 1980 and 81 ( in 1980).  The NFL did not start to officially recognize the sack until the 1982 season, unofficially, Hardman's  career sacks ranks him tied with Clyde Simmons for 30th all-time.  Hardman was a two-time Pro Bowler in 1971 and 1975 and he was a member of the Oakland Raiders Super Bowl XV winning team.

USFL career
On October 20, 1982, Hardman was the first player signed by the Oakland Invaders of newly formed United States Football League. 
Hardman served as a player/coach during the team's inaugural 1983 division winning, 9-9 season.

Acting career

Movies
 House Party (1990) – Rock
 Stir Crazy (1980) – Big Mean
 The Candidate (1972) – Actor

Television
The Fall Guy (1981) – Righteous (1 episode)
The Fall Guy: Part 1 (1981, as Cedrick Hardman) – Righteous
Police Woman (1975) – Large Man (1 episode)
Police Woman: "The Company" (1975, as Cedrick Hardman) – Large Man
Criminal Minds: "Blood Relations" (2014) – Hand double

Personal life
Hardman is related to current NFL defensive tackle Jonathan Marshall of the New York Jets.

References

External links
 Cedrick Hardman's Official Website
 
 Cedrick Hardman on TV.com

1948 births
2019 deaths
Players of American football from Houston
American football defensive ends
Burials at Pacific View Memorial Park
San Francisco 49ers players
Oakland Raiders players
National Conference Pro Bowl players
North Texas Mean Green football players
Oakland Invaders players